The 14th Pan American Games were held in Santo Domingo, Dominican Republic from August 1 to August 17, 2003.

Medals

Gold
Suriname has originally won one gold medal through Letitia Vriesde's performance in the women's 800m. However she was later stripped of the medal due to testing positive for drugs.

Results by event

Triathlon

See also
Suriname at the 2002 Central American and Caribbean Games
Suriname at the 2004 Summer Olympics

References

Nations at the 2003 Pan American Games
P
2003